Fanny Drew is a Canadian film producer, who was a cofounder of Colonelle Films with Sarah Mannering and Geneviève Dulude-De Celles. She is most noted as producer of the 2018 film A Colony (Une colonie), which was the winner of the Canadian Screen Award for Best Motion Picture at the 7th Canadian Screen Awards in 2019.

Filmography

Awards

References

External links

Canadian women film producers
Film producers from Quebec
Living people
Canadian film production company founders